Pseudopomyza is a genus of flies in the family Pseudopomyzidae.

Species
Pseudopomyza antipoda (Harrison, 1955)
Pseudopomyza aranae McAlpine, 2019
Pseudopomyza aristata (Harrison, 1959)
Pseudopomyza atrimana (Meigen, 1830)
Pseudopomyza brevicaudata (Harrison, 1964)
Pseudopomyza brevis (Harrison, 1976)
Pseudopomyza collessi McAlpine, 1994
Pseudopomyza flavitarsis (Harrison, 1959)
Pseudopomyza neozelandica (Malloch, 1933)
Pseudopomyza szadziewskii Hoffeins & Woznica, 2013

References

Pseudopomyzidae
Brachycera genera
Taxa named by Gabriel Strobl
Diptera of Europe
Diptera of Australasia